Manuel Schoppel (born 30 October 1980) is a German former professional footballer who played as a goalkeeper. He made his debut on the professional league level in the Bundesliga for SC Freiburg on 4 May 2002 when he came on as a half-time substitute in a game against Hamburger SV.

References

1980 births
Living people
Association football goalkeepers
German footballers
Bundesliga players
SC Freiburg players
1. FC Schweinfurt 05 players
FV Illertissen players